Justice Bassett may refer to:

James P. Bassett (born 1956), associate justice of the New Hampshire Supreme Court
Norman L. Bassett (1869–1931), associate justice of the Maine Supreme Judicial Court

See also
Richard Basset (died between 1135 and 1144), 12th-century English judge